The International N. D. Kondratiev Foundation is an economic research organization founded in 1992 at an international conference devoted to the centenary of the birth of Nikolai Kondratiev. The foundation is accredited by the Department of Social Sciences, Russian Academy of Sciences. The founding (and now honorary) president was Leonid Abalkin, with A. A. Nikonov, Yu. V. Yakovets, G. Pallavicini (Italy), and Yakob van Dein (Netherlands) as vice-presidents. The present president is Ruslan Grinberg.

The foundation has three basic activities:
 Carrying out international conferences, symposia, Kondratieff readings;
 Coordinating interdisciplinary research performed on the orders of the state organizations and according to the plans of the foundation itself;
 Conducting jointly with the Russian Academy of Sciences international competitions for the N.D. Kondratieff gold, silver, and bronze medals for contributions to the development of the social sciences, and the commemorative N.D. Kondratieff medal for young scientists.

Kondratiev medals 
In 1993 the foundation and the Russian Academy of Sciences established gold, silver, and bronze medals in honour of Kondratiev. These are awarded every three years after a competition. Three are awarded to local and three to foreign scientists for their contribution to the development of social sciences.

Medal winners 
1995: Sergey Glazyev and Wilhelm Krelle (Germany) - gold medal; A.I. Subetto and C. Marchetti (Italy) - silver medal; V.K. Faltsman and I.M. Abramov (Belarus) - bronze medals.
1998: Vladimir Yakovets, G.Pallavicini (Italy), and Michael Ellman (The Netherlands) - gold medal; V. Gusarov, and P. Malyaska (Finland) - silver medal; T.G. Semenkova, A.V. Semenkov, and A.E. Kulinkovich (Ukraine) - Bronze medal.
2001: I.V. Bestuzhev-Lada and I. Lukin (Ukraine) - gold medal; V.T. Ryazanov - silver medal; N.A. Makasheva, W. Barnett (UK), and W. Samuels (USA) - bronze medals.
2004: A.G. Granberg, B.N. Kuzyk and I. Wallerstein (USA) - gold medal; P.A. Minakir and Tessaleno Devezas (Portugal) - silver medal; L.V. Leskov, and D.K. Chistilin (Ukraine) - Bronze medal.
2007: Ruslan Grinberg, A.J. Rubinstein, and Shuchen Liu (China) - gold medal; V.I. Kushlin, Christopher Freeman (England), and Paul JJ Welfens (Germany) - silver medal; V.D. Andrianov, V. Klin - bronze medals.
2010: Vladimir Kvint, Masaaki Hirooka (Japan), V. K. Senchagov, P. N. Klyukin - gold medal; Jerzy Kleer (Poland) - silver medal.
2012: Askar Akayev, Andrey Korotayev, Leonid Grinin - gold medal; Carlota Perez - silver medal; George Modelski - bronze medal.
2014: Elżbieta Mączyńska-Ziemacka - gold medal; William Thompson - silver medal; Leo Nefiodow - bronze medal.
2017: Fred Phillips, Viktor Sadovnichy - gold medal; Brian Berry - silver medal; Ibrahim Fraihat - bronze medal.

References

External links 
 

International learned societies
Economic research institutes
Social sciences organizations
Organizations established in 1992